Cheshmeh Nezar or Cheshmeh-ye Nazar may refer to:
 Cheshmeh Nezar-e Olya
 Cheshmeh Nezar-e Sofla